Raymond Claude Bonney (10 March 1919 – 25 April 1994) was an Australian politician.

Bonney was born in Tasmania. In 1972, he was elected to the Tasmanian House of Assembly as a Liberal member for Braddon. He was Deputy Liberal Leader from 1977 to 1979. He retired in 1986.

References

1919 births
1994 deaths
Liberal Party of Australia members of the Parliament of Tasmania
Members of the Tasmanian House of Assembly
20th-century Australian politicians